Acrocercops scandalota is a moth of the family Gracillariidae. It is known from India (Karnataka).

The larvae feed on Mallotus philippinensis and Helicteres isora. They probably mine the leaves of their host plant. The mine has the form of  a blotch beneath the upper cuticle of the leaves. Several larvae are found in one mine.

References

scandalota
Moths described in 1914
Moths of Asia